The eOdisha Summit is an Indian conference, exhibition and awards summit held every year with themes of e-governance, information technology and healthcare. The eOdisha Summits of 2013 and 2014 aimed at active knowledge sharing, showcasing of existing governance, education, healthcare, and information technology (IT) initiatives in Odisha.

Editions
 eOdisha Summit 2013
 eOdisha Summit 2014

Partners

 Powered by: eGov
 Organisers: eLets Technomedia, Centre for Science, Development and Media Studies
 Hosting Partners: Government of Odisha, Odisha Computer Application Centre

External links
 Official Website of EOdisha Summit

Odisha
Technology conferences
Business conferences in India
E-government in India